Yhyacinthe Mewoli Abdon (born 18 October 1985 in Etoa) is a Cameroonian professional boxer. He competed in the lightweight event at the 2012 Summer Olympics and was eliminated in the round of 32 by Fazliddin Gaibnazarov. After his defeat, he was one of seven Cameroonian athletes who disappeared from the Olympic Village. He told media he wanted to stay in the UK to further his career. He was granted asylum and settled in Stockton-on-Tees.

Professional career
He turned pro in 2014, and began competing under name Abdon Cesar.

Professional boxing record

External links

References

1985 births
Living people
Olympic boxers of Cameroon
Boxers at the 2012 Summer Olympics
Cameroonian male boxers
African Games bronze medalists for Cameroon
African Games medalists in boxing
Competitors at the 2011 All-Africa Games
Lightweight boxers
21st-century Cameroonian people